Loumbila is a department or commune of Oubritenga Province in northern-central Burkina Faso. Its capital lies at the town of Loumbila. According to the 1996 census the department has a total population of 26,368.

Towns and villages

 Loumbila	(1 596 inhabitants) (capital)
 Bangrin	(1 121 inhabitants)
 Bendogo	(397 inhabitants)
 Daguilma	(854 inhabitants)
 Donsin	(806 inhabitants)
 Dogomnogo	(1 351 inhabitants)
 Gandin	(599 inhabitants)
 Goué	(1 878 inhabitants)
 Goundry	(652 inhabitants)
 Ipala	(394 inhabitants)
 Kogninga	(410 inhabitants)
 Koulsinga	(98 inhabitants)
 Kouriyaoghin	(753 inhabitants)
 Nabdogo	(531 inhabitants)
 Nangtenga	(245 inhabitants)
 Nonguestenga	(405 inhabitants)
 Nomgana	(1 816 inhabitants)
 Noungou	(1 044 inhabitants)
 Pendissi	(744 inhabitants)
 Pendogo	(207 inhabitants)
 Poédogo I	(1 748 inhabitants)
 Poédogo II	(377 inhabitants)
 Pousghin	(2 180 inhabitants)
 Ramitenga	(390 inhabitants)
 Silmiougou	(1 900 inhabitants)
 Tabtenga	(1 556 inhabitants)
 Tangzougou	(724 inhabitants)
 Tanlaorgo	(238 inhabitants)
 Wavoussé	(788 inhabitants)
 Zongo	(566 inhabitants)

References

Departments of Burkina Faso
Oubritenga Province